Training Squadron Six (VT-6) or TRARON SIX, known as the Shooters, callsign "Shooter", is a United States Navy primary training squadron stationed at Naval Air Station Whiting Field flying the T-6B Texan. The Shooters are one of five primary training squadrons in operation today.

History

On July 1, 1956, Multi-Engine Training Group (METG) was established at NAS Pensacola. At the time, student aviators would receive primary training in the T-34B and intermediate training in the T-28B/C. On May 1, 1960, METG was redesignated into Training Squadron 6 (VT-6) as a primary squadron stationed aboard NAS Whiting Field in Milton, FL, flying the TC-45. At the time VT-6 provided primary and intermediate flight training for students, as well as advanced flight training for students in the rotary and lighter-than-air pipeline. During the T-28 era, VT-6 functioned as a complete training squadron, primary to advanced. With the introduction of the T-34C and T-6B, the mission of VT-6 shifted to only primary training. Since that time, VT-6 has served as one of five primary training squadrons in the Navy, responsible for initial training of Student Naval Aviators.

Awards

 Chief of Naval Operations Aviation Safety Award, 2005, 2013

See also
Naval aviation
Student Naval Aviator
U.S. Navy Training Squadrons
Training Air Wing Five
Naval Air Training Command

References

External links

VT-6